Ganapa is a 2015 Kannada  gangster film, written and directed by Prabhu Srinivas. It stars Santosh Balraj and Priyanka Thimmesh.  The movie is based on incidents that took place in the Bangalore underworld and shares a similar plot of 2003 Kannada film Kariya.  The movie runs 112 minutes. it has been dubbed by Pen Movies in Hindi as Daada Ka Vaada.

Cast
 Santosh Balraj as Ganapa
 Priyanka Thimmesh as Brunda
 Tharun Master as Jayanna
 Kalyan Master as Suresh aka Uncle
 Tumkur Mohan as Muttanna
 Petrol Prasanna as Madesha
 Manjunath Gowda as Muttanna's son
 Sunetra Pandit as Muttanna's wife
 Padmaja Rao as Brunda's mother 
 Devadarshini
 Ranjitha

Soundtrack 

Sonu Nigam sung the song "Muddagi Neenu", penned by Jayant Kaikini, that became a Top 10 Kannada song of the year.

References

External links 

2015 films
2010s Kannada-language films
Films set in Bangalore
Indian gangster films
Indian crime action films
Films directed by Prabhu Srinivas